Yakovlevka is a rural locality (a selo) and the administrative center of Yakovlevsky District, Primorsky Krai, Russia. Population:

References

Notes

Sources

Rural localities in Primorsky Krai